The Anthology is a double CD greatest hits album of by Australian singer songwriter James Reyne. The album includes tracks from the last three decades. 
Reyne said "I've been working as a singer, musician and songwriter for a while now, and feel that it may only be that I've started to grasp how it all works relatively recently. I know I'm a better craftsman now than I was, so welcomed the idea of this Anthology/retrospective of my solo stuff. The first CD includes all the solo "hits" that I've had, but most importantly to me, provides a threshold to the later and more recent songs; tunes that many would never have heard. They are culled from the albums The Whiff of Bedlam, Design for Living, Speedboats for Breakfast, Every Man a King, and Thirteen and I hope, provide an insight into what I've really been up to."

Reyne performed a series of live acoustic shows to showcase ‘'The Anthology'’, in New South Wales, Queensland and Victoria.

Track listing
CD1

CD2

Release history

References

James Reyne albums
Compilation albums by Australian artists
Universal Music Australia albums
2014 compilation albums